Bait Island is an island located near Tawau in the Tawau Division, Sabah, Malaysia. The predominant languages spoken in this island are Javanese and Malay language and its currency is Malaysian ringgit (MYR).

See also
 List of islands of Malaysia

External links 
 Pulau Bait
 Map Carta (Pulau Bait)

References 

Islands of Sabah